Jacques Nicolet (born 5 April 1956 in Gigondas) is a French businessman and racing driver. He is the chairman of the Supervisory Board for Altarea SCA, a French real estate investment and development company, which he co-founded in 1994 with Alain Taravela. He was previously the director of development at the Pierre & Vacances Group between 1984 and 1994. He is also the owner and a driver of OAK Racing, a Le Mans 24 Hours and FIA World Endurance Championship racing team.

Racing career
Nicolet began his racing career in historic racing, competing in the V de V Historic Series between 2001 and 2006. In 2003, he formed Heritage Racing Cars, responsible for maintaining classic endurance sports cars. At the end of 2006, Nicolet bought Saulnier Racing. He began racing for the team in the Le Mans Series and at the 24 Hours of Le Mans. In 2008, he partnered with Henri Pescarolo of Pescarolo Sport to form Pescarolo Automobiles. In 2009 Nicolet established OAK Racing, with the Saulnier Racing operation becoming OAK Racing Mazda Team France and Heritage Racing Cars becoming OAK Racing Team Heritage.

Racing record

24 Hours of Le Mans results

Complete FIA World Endurance Championship results

References

External links
 

Living people
1956 births
French businesspeople
French racing drivers
European Le Mans Series drivers
24 Hours of Le Mans drivers
American Le Mans Series drivers
FIA World Endurance Championship drivers
Asian Le Mans Series drivers
Everspeed
Eurasia Motorsport drivers
OAK Racing drivers
Sports car racing team owners